Janusz Paluszkiewicz (20 March 1912 – 19 February 1990) was a Polish actor. He appeared in more than 50 films and television shows between 1952 and 1988.

Selected filmography
 A Generation (1955)
 Man on the Tracks (1956)
 Knights of the Teutonic Order (1960)

References

External links

1912 births
1990 deaths
Polish male film actors
Actors from Łódź